This is a list of baseball players who died during their careers. These deaths occurred during a game, due to illness, results of accidents, acts of violence, or suicide.

Repeated studies have shown that Major League Baseball players have a greater life expectancy than males in the general U.S. population — about five years more, on average, which is attributed to their superior fitness and healthy lifestyles. The longer the active career, the longer the player lives, on average. This correlation is attributed to the maintenance of fitness and increased wealth.

Deaths of active players
This is a list of notable deaths in baseball and untimely deaths of active professional baseball players.

Major League Baseball
The following Major League Baseball players died during their careers.

Former players of Major League Baseball still active in professional baseball at the time of their death

Minor League Baseball
Minor league players are listed with their major league affiliate team, else denoted with a dagger if their team was unaffiliated.

Nippon Professional Baseball

Negro leagues

Dutch League Baseball

College baseball

See also 

 Sportspeople who died during their careers
 List of Major League Baseball players who died in wars

Notes

References

Sources

Further reading

^
Died
Baseball
Baseball